The 2015 BMW Malaysian Open was a women's tennis tournament played on outdoor hard courts. It is the 6th edition of the Malaysian Open and is an International tournament on the 2015 WTA Tour. The tournament took place from 28 February to 8 March 2015 at the Royal Selangor Golf Club. This tournament had been discontinued, but was restarted when the rights were bought off the tournament in Palermo, Italy.
Caroline Wozniacki defeated Alexandra Dulgheru in the championship match for her 1st title of the year and 23rd of her career.

Points and prize money distribution

Points distribution

Prize money

Singles main-draw entrants

Seeds

1 Rankings are as of February 23, 2015.

Other entrants 
The following players received wildcards into the singles main draw:
 Hsieh Su-wei
  Jawairiah Noordin
  Sabine Lisicki

The following players received entry from the qualifying draw:
  Yuliya Beygelzimer
  Elizaveta Kulichkova
  Magda Linette
  Junri Namigata
  Wang Yafan
  Xu Yifan

Withdrawals 
Before the tournament
  Zarina Diyas →replaced by Patricia Mayr-Achleitner
  Marina Erakovic →replaced by Çağla Büyükakçay
  Romina Oprandi →replaced by Misa Eguchi
  Carla Suárez Navarro →replaced by Zhu Lin

Doubles main-draw entrants

Seeds 

Rankings are as of February 23, 2015.

Other entrants 
The following pair received wildcard into the doubles main draw:
  Jawairiah Noordin /  Theiviya Selvarajoo

Finals

Singles 

  Caroline Wozniacki defeated  Alexandra Dulgheru, 4–6, 6–2, 6–1

Doubles 

  Liang Chen /  Wang Yafan defeated  Yuliya Beygelzimer /  Olga Savchuk, 4–6, 6–3, [10–4]

References

External links
 Official website

Malaysian Open
Malaysian Open (tennis)
2015 in Malaysian tennis
2015 in Malaysian women's sport